Ramón González or Ramon Gonzalez may refer to:

Politics
Ramón González Valencia (1851–1928), Colombian military officer and politician
Ramon Gonzalez, Jr. (born 1947), Republican member of the Kansas House of Representatives.
Ramón González González (born 1962), Mexican politician

Sports
Ramón González (baseball) (1895–?), Cuban baseball player
Ramón González (footballer, born 1898), Spanish football forward
Ramón González (javelin thrower) (born 1966), Cuban javelin thrower
Ramón González Arrieta (born 1967), Spanish cyclist
Ray González, (Ramón González Rivera, born 1972), Puerto Rican professional wrestler 
Ramón González (footballer, born 1974), Spanish football manager and former centre-back

Others
Ramón González Peña  (1888–1952), Basque socialist and trade union leader